Our Wife may refer to:
 Our Wife (1931 film), an American pre-Code comedy film
 Our Wife (1941 film), an American romantic comedy film